Anthony Michael Lewis Polite (born 21 June 1997) is a Swiss professional basketball player for Hamburg Towers of the German Basketball Bundesliga. He played college basketball for the Florida State Seminoles.

Early life and high school career
Polite was born in Lugano, Switzerland, where his father was playing basketball professionally. He grew up playing football and basketball. He moved to the United States to attend high school at Saint Andrew's School in Boca Raton, Florida. As a senior, Polite averaged 20 points and 11.7 rebounds per game, earning All-Palm Beach 6A-1A Player of the Year honors for a second straight year. He committed to playing college basketball for Florida State over an offer from Miami (Florida), among others.

College career
Polite redshirted his first season at Florida State due to knee injuries. As a freshman, he averaged 2.7 points per game. Polite averaged 5.8 points in his sophomore season. On 22 March 2021, he scored a career-high 22 points in a 71–53 win over Colorado at the second round of the NCAA tournament. As a junior, Polite averaged 10.1 points and 4.5 rebounds per game, shooting 43.6 percent from three-point range. 

On 5 April 2022, Polite declared for the 2022 NBA draft, forgoing his remaining college eligibility.

Professional career
On July 13, 2022, he has signed with ASVEL of the French LNB Pro A.

On January 14, 2023, he signed with Hamburg Towers of the German Basketball Bundesliga.

National team career
Polite represented Switzerland at the 2015 FIBA Europe Under-18 Championship Division B and the 2013 FIBA Europe Under-16 Championship Division B.

Career statistics

College

|-
| style="text-align:left;"| 2017–18
| style="text-align:left;"| Florida State
| 1 || 0 || 4.0 || – || – || – || 1.0 || 1.0 || 1.0 || .0 || .0
|-
| style="text-align:left;"| 2018–19
| style="text-align:left;"| Florida State
| 30 || 0 || 10.6 || .382 || .239 || .773 || 1.6 || .6 || .6 || .0 || 2.7
|-
| style="text-align:left;"| 2019–20
| style="text-align:left;"| Florida State
| 31 || 8 || 19.7 || .406 || .354 || .679 || 2.9 || 1.1 || 1.2 || .2 || 5.8
|-
| style="text-align:left;"| 2020–21
| style="text-align:left;"| Florida State
| 21 || 16 || 26.6 || .500 || .436 || .667 || 4.5 || 1.8 || 1.4 || .4 || 10.1
|-
| style="text-align:left;"| 2021–22
| style="text-align:left;"| Florida State
| 24 || 24 || 27.9 || .429 || .321 || .800 || 5.6 || 2.5 || 1.5 || .5 || 9.9 
|- class="sortbottom"
| style="text-align:center;" colspan="2"| Career
| 107 || 48 || 20.2 || .436 || .349 || .741 || 3.4 || 1.4 || 1.1 || .3 || 6.6

Personal life
Polite's father, Michael, played college basketball for Florida State before embarking on a professional career in Europe.

References

External links
Florida State Seminoles bio

1997 births
Living people
ASVEL Basket players
Florida State Seminoles men's basketball players
Sportspeople from Lugano
Small forwards
Swiss expatriate basketball people in France
Swiss expatriate basketball people in the United States
Swiss men's basketball players
Swiss people of American descent